The term Orthodoxy in Syria may refer to:

 Eastern Orthodoxy in Syria, representing adherents, communities and institutions of various Eastern Orthodox Churches, in Syria
 Oriental Orthodoxy in Syria, representing adherents, communities and institutions of various Oriental Orthodox Churches, in Syria
 Islamic Orthodoxy in Syria, representing adherents, communities and institutions of Sunni Islam, in Syria
 any other form of orthodoxy in Syria (political, ideological, social, economic, scientific, artistic)

See also
 Orthodoxy (disambiguation)
 Orthodox Church (disambiguation)
 Syria (disambiguation)